Denis Rancourt is a former professor of physics at the University of Ottawa. Rancourt is widely known for his confrontations with his former employer, the University of Ottawa, over issues involving his grade inflation and "academic squatting," the act of arbitrarily changing the topic of a course without departmental permission.

University conflict
His conflicts with the university started in 2005 when, in what was termed "academic squatting," he changed a course to focus "not just [on] how science impacts everyday life, but how it relates to greater power structures". In June 2008 a labour law arbitrator sided with Rancourt and ruled that "teaching science through social activism is protected by academic freedom." Rancourt was removed from all teaching duties in the fall of 2008 because the dean of the faculty of science did not agree with his granting A+ grades to 23 students in one course of the winter 2008 semester. In December, the Allan Rock administration of the University of Ottawa began dismissal proceedings against him and he was banned from campus. This generated a province-wide (Ontario) and national (Canada) public debate on grading in university courses. The university's Executive Committee of the Board of Governors  voted unanimously to fire Rancourt on March 31, 2009. Rancourt has expressed the opinion that the grading issue was a pretext for his dismissal. Canadian media reports have echoed that Rancourt's dismissal was political. Rancourt has grieved the dismissal and the Canadian Association of University Teachers is running an Independent Committee of Inquiry into the matter. The dismissal case went to binding arbitration where Rancourt's union took the position that the grading issue was a pretext to remove Rancourt and that the termination was done in bad faith. Arbitrator Claude Foisy ruled in a decision dated January 27, 2014, to uphold the university's dismissal of Rancourt. On March 10, 2014, Rancourt's union announced that it would appeal the Arbitrator's award.

U of O Watch blog
While at Ottawa Rancourt started a blog, U of O Watch, to report various alleged malfeasance of administrators and of his colleagues. The University used "copyright infringement" against the blog for using University web site images and disciplined Rancourt with a suspension that was grieved by Rancourt.

In June 2011 University of Ottawa law professor Joanne St. Lewis sued Rancourt for $1 million over two U of O Watch blog posts about her. The Law Times (Canada) did a feature about the case on August 29, 2011.

The action went to trial in May 2014, but Rancourt walked out of the trial in the first week citing "reasonable apprehension of bias" and a "kangaroo court", because the judge had struck out one of his defenses during his opening statement to the jury. In June 2014, the court found Rancourt had libeled St. Lewis, and awarded $350,000 in damages, plus court costs. Rancourt appealed the decision, but his appeal was denied and he was ordered to pay St. Lewis $30,000 in costs for the appeal.

Suspension, dismissal, and Foisy arbitration
On November 22, 2008, Rancourt was blocked from entering his physics laboratory in the MacDonald Hall building. In the student newspaper The Fulcrum, the University's Director of Communications, Andrée Dumulon, stated that "[a]ccess was prohibited because we found that there were some unauthorized individuals in the lab." Rancourt complained that the administration did not justify or explain the action. Rancourt was then banned from accessing the laboratory.

On December 10, 2008, Rancourt was provided with two letters by administration officials. The first letter indicated that he was under administrative suspension and banned from campus, while the second indicated that the Dean of the Faculty of Science had recommended to the Board of Governors that Rancourt be fired. The stated reason for the University of Ottawa's actions was Rancourt's assigning of A+ grades to all students in his fourth-year physics courses in the Winter 2008 term. These courses include Quantum Mechanics (a required course) and Solid State Physics.

Rancourt states the administration's actions in general, and his dismissal in particular, are influenced in part by the Israel lobby and the military-industrial complex. He has stated that his dismissal may be related to his political views, specifically his position on the Israel-Palestine conflict, and wrote in his blog that university of Ottawa president (and former Minister of Justice) Allan Rock appears to be "a point-man of the Israel lobby at the University of Ottawa."

In June 2009 all charges against Rancourt in relation to his January 2009 campus arrest for trespassing were dropped. In July 2009 Rancourt received Employment Insurance (EI) payments after EI found that the university's position that he was dismissed with cause (thereby barring benefit payments) could not be upheld.

In December 2008, Rancourt's research associate of over 12 years Dr. Mei-Zhen Dang was locked out of the laboratory and fired without notice, explanation or compensation. In February 2009 she sued the university and in August 2009 she won a settlement. Two graduate students of Rancourt were also claimants on the lawsuit and alleged that they had been punished for being in Rancourt's research group. The graduate students stated they were intimidated with threats to their scholarships into dropping the lawsuit and their lawyer stated that a salient feature of the case is that "it has a very political nature."

In 2011, the dismissal case went to binding labor arbitration with Arbitrator Claude Foisy presiding. There were almost 30 days of hearings, with the last hearing day being June 26, 2013. The arbitration judgement was expected within a few months of the end of the hearings. During the hearings the University accused Rancourt of "inciting students to violence", and put a YouTube music video about anarchism into evidence. Following the conclusion of the arbitration hearings, The Chronicle of Higher Education characterized the case as "raising questions about academic freedom and its limits".

Covert surveillance
In January 2010, Rancourt released a public report about the University of Ottawa having practiced extensive covert surveillance of him and of several students in the period 2006–2008, based on information obtained via an access to information law appeal. The use of covert surveillance appears to be in contrast to the University position that "all procedures required by the collective agreement with the Association des Professeurs de l'Université d'Ottawa (APUO) in this matter had been properly followed." On February 4, 2010, student Wayne Sawtell openly called on President Allan Rock to intervene and suggested that the administration's silence amounted to a cover-up. Following a February 27, 2010, investigative report by Canadians for Accountability, some further aspects of the covert surveillance campaign and its cover-up were reported in the media on April 11, 2010, including the role of the student newspaper The Fulcrum. On January 27, 2010, the union representing student employees at the University of Ottawa, the Canadian Union of Public Employees (CUPE, Local 2626), filed a labour law grievance against the university for surveillance against several of its members. In October 2010 the union reported to its members that it had settled with the university. The settlement ensured that information gathered on students would not be allowed in the student employee files. At least one original student griever was displeased and went to the media.

CAUT review
In November 2008, the Canadian Association of University Teachers announced that it would establish an Independent Committee of Inquiry (ICOI) with terms of reference to: 1) "examine the series of ongoing disputes between Rancourt and the University of Ottawa"; 2) "to determine whether there were breaches or threats to academic freedom and other faculty rights"; and 3) "to make any appropriate recommendations." The Committee consists of three professors from York University, Wilfrid Laurier University, and Rider University. The Committee does not have a fixed time line to work with, but previous ICOI's have generally taken two years to complete their investigation and publish a final report. The report was released in 2017 and concluded that "the University of Ottawa was justified in terminating Dr. Rancourt for insubordination."

Access to information
On September 29, 2010, the Information and Privacy Commissioner (Ontario) released ruling PO-2915 in an access to information (ATI) case involving Rancourt and the University of Ottawa. It was shown that a letter dated September 6, 2007, sent to Rancourt by Rancourt's dean questioning Rancourt's "physical and mental well-being" was based entirely on emails exchanged with university high officials and the university Legal Counsel; suggesting "a broad plan to fire" Rancourt, as widely reported in the media.

Climate change views

In February, 2007, Rancourt published an essay disputing the scientific consensus on climate change on his blog., which was applauded by climate change deniers Alexander Cockburn and James Inhofe.

References 

Canadian activists
Industrial Workers of the World members
Living people
1957 births
Franco-Ontarian people
People from North Bay, Ontario
University of Ottawa alumni
University of Toronto alumni
Academic staff of the University of Ottawa